Harriet Anna Mayor  (born December 13, 1933) is the President of the J. William and Harriet Fulbright Center and Board President of Harriet Fulbright College. She is the second wife, and widow, of United States Senator J. William Fulbright. Mayor was the former Executive Director of the President's Committee on the Arts and Humanities under President Bill Clinton.

Early life and education
Harriet Fulbright was born in New York City, New York on December 13, 1933.  Her father, Brantz Mayor, worked for Time Magazine.  She has five siblings, one of whom is bestselling mystery author Archer Mayor.  The family moved often during Fulbright's youth and as a consequence, she spent much of her childhood in Washington, D.C., New York City and Toronto, Ontario, Canada.

Her first overseas experience was at the age of 14, when she traveled to Colombia for a summer study program. She continued her education at Radcliffe College, the women's college counterpart to Harvard University, where she earned her Bachelor of Arts in 1955. In 1975, Fulbright earned her MFA from the George Washington University in Washington, D.C.

Fulbright married William Watts in 1953 and gave birth to three daughters. The family spent two years each stationed in the USSR and South Korea and one year in Germany.  She taught English in each country and would continue to teach for many years to come.

Life with Senator Fulbright
In 1987, Mayor served as the Executive Director of the Fulbright Association and moved the headquarters from Bryn Mawr, Pennsylvania to Washington, D.C. Senator Fulbright was on the board of the Fulbright Association at the time and the two began spending time together. The two were married on March 10, 1990, in a private ceremony at Senator Fulbright's home in Washington when JWFulbright was 83 years old.

After marrying, the two traveled for two years before JW Fulbright suffered from the first of several strokes before his death. Notable trips included a journey to Japan for the publication of Fulbright's autobiography, Against the Arrogance of Power: My Personal History, Moscow and Germany after the fall of the Berlin Wall and Hawaii. Near the end of January 1992, Senator Fulbright suffered the last of many strokes. He died on February 9, 1995.

Recent activities
Harriet Fulbright serves as an "unofficial ambassador" for the Fulbright Program and is often invited to speak at events that range from university commencements to milestone anniversaries for Fulbright Commissions around the world who are celebrating the presence of her late husband's educational exchange program in their respective countries.  As a result of her status as an international figure of peace and education, she has received many awards and honorary degrees. She currently sits on the advisory board of the Alliance for Peacebuilding. In 2006, she created the J. William & Harriet Fulbright Center, a nonprofit dedicated to promoting peace through international education and furthering her late husband's legacy. She currently serves as president of the organization. Recently, Fulbright celebrated her 75th birthday in Washington.

Awards and honors
Fulbright has received numerous honor and accolades throughout her career.  Below is a partial list:

References

1933 births
Living people
Radcliffe College alumni
George Washington University alumni
Honorary Members of the Order of Australia
Recipients of the Order of Merit of the Republic of Hungary
People from New York City